Idiopathic facial aseptic granuloma is a cutaneous condition characterized by a chronic, painless, solitary nodule, reminiscent of an acne nodule, appearing on the cheeks of young children. It has a prolonged course, but spontaneously heals.

See also 
 Granulomatous facial dermatitis
 List of cutaneous conditions

References 

Acneiform eruptions